Ulua aurochs, the silvermouth trevally, is a species of trevally in the family Carangidae. It is found in the Indo-Pacific.

Distribution and habitat
The silvermouth trevally is found in the Indo-Pacific in the western and central Pacific Ocean. Its range is from New Guinea, northern Australia, the Philippines, and Pacific islands in the western and central Pacific Ocean.

Description

References

aurochs
Fish described in 1915